The 2010 Southeastern Conference baseball tournament was held at Regions Park in Hoover, AL from May 26 through 30. LSU won the tournament for the third straight season and earned the Southeastern Conference's automatic bid to the NCAA tournament.

Regular Season results
The top eight teams (based on conference results) from the conference earned invites to the tournament.

 
- Eliminated from SEC Tournament Contention
Standings after 5/22

Format
The 2010 tournament will once again feature a "flipped bracket".  This means that after two days of play the undefeated team from each bracket will move into the other bracket.  This reduces the number of rematches teams will have to play in order to win the tournament.  Additionally, the tournament will be debuting a "pitch clock," limiting the amount of time that pitchers have to throw the ball to 20 seconds. This rule will not be in effect when runners are on base.

Tournament

 After two days of play, the undefeated team from each bracket moved to the other bracket.
 *Game went to extra innings
 ^Game ended after 7 innings because of mercy rule
 All semi-final games were 7 innings due to inclement weather in the Hoover area.

All-Tournament Team

See also
College World Series
NCAA Division I Baseball Championship
Southeastern Conference baseball tournament

External links
SECSports.com

Tournament
Southeastern Conference Baseball Tournament
Southeastern Conference baseball tournament
Southeastern Conference baseball tournament
College sports tournaments in Alabama
Baseball competitions in Hoover, Alabama